Ian Hamilton Harvey (1 January 1903 – 22 October 1966) was a New Zealand rugby union player. A lock, Harvey represented Wairarapa at a provincial level, and was a member of the New Zealand national side, the All Blacks, from 1924 to 1928. He played 18 matches for the All Blacks, including one international.

References

1903 births
1966 deaths
Rugby union players from Masterton
New Zealand rugby union players
New Zealand international rugby union players
Wairarapa rugby union players
Rugby union locks